In una notte di chiaro di luna (internationally released as Crystal or Ash, Fire or Wind, as Long as It's Love, also known as On a Moonlit Night and As Long as It's Love)  is a 1989 Italian drama film directed by Lina Wertmüller. It entered the competition at the 46th Venice International Film Festival.

Cast 
Rutger Hauer as John Knott
Nastassja Kinski as Joëlle
Dominique Sanda as Carol
Peter O'Toole as Professor McShoul
Faye Dunaway as Mrs. Colbert
George Eastman as Zaccarias
Massimo Wertmuller as Max
Giuseppe Cederna

References

External links

1989 films
Films about journalists
Films directed by Lina Wertmüller
Films set in England
Films set in France
Films set in Italy
Films set in the United States
HIV/AIDS in film
Italian drama films
1980s English-language films
English-language Italian films
1980s Italian-language films
1989 multilingual films
Italian multilingual films
1980s Italian films